The Samoryadovka is a river in Dmitrovsky and Mytishchinsky Districts of Moscow Oblast, Russia. It is a left tributary of the Ucha.

It flows through the work settlement of Nekrasovsky and the villages of Laryovo and Lyskovo, and then flows into the Ucha at the village of Sukharevo.

References

Rivers of Moscow Oblast
Mytishchinsky District